Nutopia is an independent television production company established in 2008 with offices in London and Washington, D.C. It specializes in making non-scripted and documentary television programmes, including America: The Story of Us for History, One Strange Rock for National Geographic and Civilisations for BBC.

Jane Root, former president of the Discovery Channel USA and Controller of BBC2, and Laura Franses co-founded the production company with board members Michael Jackson and Sir Peter Bazalgette. Franses left the company in 2012.

Nutopia's first production was the 12-hour America: The Story of Us series for History US, and has since produced shows for networks including History Channel, The National Geographic CNN, ITV, PBS, Channel 4, BBC and Sky Atlantic amongst others. Nutopia followed America The Story of US with documentaries of the same format, including Mankind: The Story of All of Us and Australia: The Story of Us.

Most recent Nutopia projects include One Strange Rock, Civilisations and Jesus: His Life.

History
Nutopia was first founded in 2008 and according to The Guardian, the production company set out with the aim of producing and selling large-scale documentaries for the United States cable market.

In 2009, Nutopia brokered a deal with The History Channel to create America: The Story of Us. It was one of the first productions by Nutopia, which according to The Guardian cost three times the average budget an hour. Over the next two years, the production company grew to a core staff of 15 and had an annual turnover of £15 million.

In 2012, Nutopia released another series in The Story of Us format titled, Mankind: The Story of All of Us. It was the third installment of the Story of Us documentaries and studied the historical developments within ancient empires that shaped how we live today. The estimated cost of the production was $36 million for the 12-part series. Nutopia was also responsible for the production of the British and American documentary, Bin Laden: Shoot to Kill, which aired on PBS and Channel 4 in 2011.

Before the end of 2012, the production company was responsible for a number of well-received shows in both Britain and the United States. These included How We Invented the World and The British, which aired on Sky Atlantic. Nutopia and The National Geographic Channel announced in 2013 that they would be creating a series, The 80s: The Decade that Made Us. The show was narrated by Rob Lowe and received mainly positive reviews for its study of the decade.

Nutopia's next major drama was on the Algerian siege on a gas plant. The show aired in Canada, the United States and also the UK. It documented the events in the run-up and conclusions drawn from the deadly terrorist attack, which left at least 67 dead. In 2014, the production company produced The '90s: The Last Great Decade. It studies events during the decade, with a summary of political, social and economic developments. The programme was a nine-episode series, which aired in the summer of 2014.

In 2015, the TV show announced the co-produced documentary, Australia: The Story of Us. It was a regionalized version of the American television documentary series, which studied the history of the country. This included people, places and events that have shaped the country over the last 40,000 years. Towards the end of the year, the Smithsonian Channel aired My Million Dollar Invention. NY Daily News referred to the series as an "ambitious 8 part series," which studies a number of historical inventions. The third installment of the decade-based documentaries was televised in 2015, The 2000s: A New Reality. Nutopia also announced the creation of the documentary, Finding Jesus. It studied new insights into the historical facts surrounding him and using new scientific techniques to study his life. Also in 2015, Nutopia produced the Emmy Award-winning How We Got to Now with Steven Johnson, which also had a companion book of the same title and website How We Get To Next. The show won an Emmy for Outstanding Motion Design in 2015.

Nutopia announced in late 2015 that they would be working on a TV series with Bear Grylls. Britain's biggest adventures with Bear Grylls aired on ITV and received positive reviews for studying the British landscape, including the Scottish Highlands and Snowdon.

In 2016, Nutopia and Bristow Global Media announced Canada: The Story of Us for CBC. Nutopia is also currently producing a six-part series on the history of Africa, hosted by Professor Henry Louis Gates, Jr. The series is being created in association with McGee Media.

Nutopia produced the National Geographic series One Strange Rock, which premiered on March 26, 2018. The second season is set to premiere in 2019. Also in March 2018, Nutopia launched Civilisations, an art history television documentary series co-produced by the BBC in association with PBS as a follow-up to the original 1969 landmark series Civilisation by Kenneth Clark.

In May 2018, Nutopia's The Great American Read launched on PBS. Hosted by Meredith Vieira, the series sought to discover America's favorite novel, in which viewers could vote from a list of 100 finalists to determine "America's Best Loved Novel." The winner of the vote was Harper Lee's "To Kill a Mockingbird".

In January 2019, it was announced that Nutopia's Jesus: His Life will debut on A&E on March 25. The series is told from the perspective of different biblical figures, scholars and historians, weaving together historical sources and cultural context to create a portrait of Jesus.

Notable productions
 America: The Story of Us (2010)
 Australia: The Story of Us (2015)
 Britain's Biggest Adventures with Bear Grylls (2015)
 Civilisations (2018)
 Limitless with Chris Hemsworth (2022)
 Mankind: The Story of All of Us (2012)
 One Strange Rock (2018)
 The '90s: The Last Great Decade (2014)
 The World According to Jeff Goldblum (2019-present)

References

External links
 

Television production companies of the United Kingdom
Television production companies of the United States